The US Army is to modify a government-owned Quick Reaction Capability Liberty Project aircraft into an Enhanced Medium Altitude Reconnaissance and Surveillance System - Multi-Intelligence (EMARSS-M) platform under a USD31.8 million contract it was announced on March 31, 2015.

The contract, which was awarded to L-3 Communications in Texas, will see a Beechcraft King Air 350ER-based MC-12W aircraft modified to a similar standard as the Boeing MC-12S EMARSS counter-improvised explosive device (C-IED) platform, but with some additional capabilities. Work was scheduled to be completed by 30 September 2016.

EMARSS is a manned multi-intelligence airborne intelligence surveillance and reconnaissance (AISR) system that provides a persistent capability to detect, locate, classify/identify, and track surface targets in day/night, near-all-weather conditions with a high degree of timeliness and accuracy. The EMARSS system consists of a King Air 350ER aircraft equipped with an electro-optic/infra-red (EO/IR) sensor, communications intelligence collection system, an aerial precision geolocation system, line-of-sight tactical and beyond line-of-sight communications suites, two Distributed Common Ground System-Army (DCGS-A) workstations and a self-protection suite.

The first EMARSS prototype made its maiden flight in June 2013, and while EMARSS was due to already be in service, programmatic protests and inter-service differences over ownership have delayed its introduction.

The Milestone C production decision was approved in August 2014. The army has disclosed its initial plans to field 12 EMARSS (plus options for 20 more), although it in unclear precisely how many of these will be converted MC-12Ws and how many will be new-builds (of the 42 MC-12W 'Project Liberty' aircraft procured by the US government, IHS Jane's believes between 8 and 12 could eventually be brought up to the EMARSS-M standard).

As originally set out, the 18-month MC-12W to EMARSS-M modification contract will include a 12-month system design and integration phase followed by a six-month government airworthiness and operational testing period.

Under the present US Army strategy, there will be EMARSS aircraft, MC-12Ws brought up to the EMARSS-M configuration, and at least two other platform types based on upgraded Quick Reaction Capability King Airs or QRC King Air capabilities that were originally developed for Afghanistan.

References

Beechcraft
United States military reconnaissance aircraft
Boeing